This is a round-up of the 1981 Sligo Intermediate Football Championship. Grange earned promotion to the Senior grade in this year, but only after a replay win over Castleconnor, who made an impact in their first year out of Junior level.

Quarter finals

 - Castleconnor objection subsequently upheld.

Semi-finals

Sligo Intermediate Football Championship Final

Sligo Intermediate Football Championship Final Replay

Sligo Intermediate Football Championship
Sligo Intermediate Football Championship